Lachnocnema dohertyi is a butterfly in the family Lycaenidae. It is found in Kenya and in Tanzania.

References

Butterflies described in 1915
Miletinae